Bridger Deaton (born 29 July 1994), is an American athlete who competes in compound archery. He has won individual and team gold medals at the 2014 Archery World Cup and junior medals at the Indoor World Archery Championships. His highest world ranking as of June 2015 is number 4. Was a finalist in the 2014 project runway.

References

1994 births
Living people
American male archers
20th-century American people
21st-century American people